Icon of the Seas is a cruise ship under construction for Royal Caribbean International and will be the lead ship of the . She is scheduled to enter service in 2024, and will have a gross tonnage of 250,800, making her the largest cruise ship in the world by gross tonnage.

History 
On 10 October 2016, Royal Caribbean and Meyer Turku announced an order to build two ships under the project name "Icon". The ships are expected to be delivered in the third quarter of 2023 and in 2025. The ships will be classified by DNV.

Royal Caribbean applied to register a trademark for "Icon of the Seas" in 2016, which was at the time suggested as an indication of the name of the first ship.

Steel-cutting for Icon of the Seas began on 14 June 2021. On 28 October 2021, Royal Caribbean announced that the first LNG tank for the ship was installed at the Neptun Werft in Rostock, Germany. In December 2021, the floating engine room unit, including the LNG tanks, was towed to Turku by tug. The keel was laid on 5 April 2022.

In May 2022, Royal Caribbean confirmed that Icon of the Seas would be bigger than the Oasis class.

Design 
Icon of the Seas will employ fuel cell technology, to be supplied by ABB Group, and be powered by liquefied natural gas, with a gross tonnage of 250,800 GT. She will contain other alternative energy features, like the use of fuel cells to produce electricity and fresh water.

The ship will have a crew of 2,350, and a capacity of 5,610 passengers at double occupancy or 7,600 passengers at maximum capacity.

It will have 20 decks with 7 swimming pools and 6 water slides. It claims to have the tallest waterfall, the tallest water slide, the largest waterpark, and the first suspended infinity pool of any ship.

References

Cruise ship classes
Proposed ships
Royal Caribbean International